Canarium dichotomum is a tree in the family Burseraceae. The specific epithet  is from the Latin meaning "forked", referring to the branching of the inflorescences.

Description
The brownish to reddish bark is smooth to scaly. The male inflorescences are dichotomously branched.

Distribution and habitat
Canarium dichotomum grows naturally in Sumatra and Borneo. Its habitat is lowland forests, rarely in submontane forest, from sea-level to  altitude.

References

dichotomum
Trees of Sumatra
Trees of Borneo
Plants described in 1859
Taxa named by Friedrich Anton Wilhelm Miquel